The 4th César Awards ceremony, presented by the Académie des Arts et Techniques du Cinéma, honoured the best French films of 1978 and took place on 3 February 1979 at the Salle Pleyel in Paris. The ceremony was chaired by Charles Vanel and hosted by Pierre Tchernia and Jean-Claude Brialy. L'Argent des autres won the award for Best Film.

Winners and nominees

See also
 51st Academy Awards
 32nd British Academy Film Awards

References

External links
 Official website
 
 4th César Awards at AlloCiné

1979
1979 film awards
Cesar